Dresden Township is one of twelve townships in Chickasaw County, Iowa, USA.  As of the 2000 census, its population was 822.

History
Dresden Township was organized in 1859.

Geography
The western portion of the city of Fredericksburg impacts eastern Dresden Township. The unincorporated hamlet of Williamstown is at the intersection of 270th Street and Mission Avenue. According to the USGS, it contains three cemeteries: North East Iowa Garden of Memories, Saint Johns and West.

Marsh Creek and other streams meander through Dresden Township, connecting to the East Fork Wapsipinicon River as it flows through the township.

Transportation
Dresden Township contains one airport or landing strip, McFarland Hereford Farm Landing Strip. Highway US-18 traverses the township as 270th Street.

Notes

References
 USGS Geographic Names Information System (GNIS)

External links
 US-Counties.com
 City-Data.com

Townships in Chickasaw County, Iowa
Townships in Iowa